Richard "Richie" Tozier is a fictional character created by Stephen King and one of the main characters of his 1986 novel It. The character is a member of "The Losers Club" and is seen to be the comic relief of the group; however, his loudmouthed antics often get him in trouble, leading to him being called "Richie 'Trashmouth' Tozier" and his friends often using the phrase "Beep Beep Richie" when they want him to be quiet. He was portrayed by Seth Green as a child and Harry Anderson as an adult in the 1990 miniseries adaptation of the novel, and by Ankur Javeri as a child and Nasirr Khan as an adult in the novel's 1998 television series adaptation. He was later portrayed by Finn Wolfhard as a child and Bill Hader as an adult in the 2017 film and its 2019 sequel.

Fictional character biography

Richard (Richie) Tozier was born on March 7, 1946 (novel), 1950 (miniseries), or 1976 (films) and is the son of Maggie and Wentworth Tozier. Richie is known for his loudmouthed and sarcastic personality, which led to him being called "Richie 'Trashmouth' Tozier" by his peers. Richie is good friends with Bill Denbrough and the other members of The Losers Club Stanley Uris, Eddie Kaspbrak, Ben Hanscom, Beverly Marsh, and Mike Hanlon. After Bill's younger brother Georgie is killed by Pennywise the Dancing Clown, Richie and his friends each have individual encounters with Pennywise before facing It collectively at Neibolt Street. After this encounter, they believe they have killed It, but they take an oath that if they have not succeeded, they will one day return to Derry to finish the job.

27 years later, Richie is a disc-jockey in Beverly Hills and one of the only members of The Losers Club to have never married. Richie receives a call from Mike – who remained behind in Derry – that It has returned, causing the death of Adrian Mellon. Richie returns to Derry and reunites with The Losers Club, with whom he encounters It once again. Eventually, the group descends into the sewers to kill It by performing the Ritual of Chud. During the ritual, It mortally wounds and kills Eddie, leaving Richie devastated.

Adaptations 
Richie was portrayed by Seth Green as a child, and by Harry Anderson as an adult in the 1990 miniseries, and by Ankur Javeri as a child and Nasir Khan as an adult (named "Raja") in the 1998 television series. The adult portrayal is well known for a scene where Pennywise taunts him in a public library, which has become iconic for Tim Curry's over-the-top performance.

Richie was portrayed again by Finn Wolfhard in the 2017 film and as an adult by Bill Hader in the 2019 sequel. This interpretation of Richie tends to make more pop-culture references and becomes a stand-up comedian as an adult rather than a DJ. A popular fan theory of Wolfhard's interpretation of the character is that his family has a tendency to neglect Richie and that he struggles with ADHD.

Richie's sexuality

In the adaptation of It Chapter Two, Richie is portrayed as being secretly in love with Eddie Kaspbrak until the latter's death, and Eddie remained unaware of these feelings. It is confirmed that Richie's reason for making jokes are just in part a defense mechanism to hide his feelings for Eddie, as most of his jokes target him, as opposed to just trying to be humorous as in the book or other adaptation of IT. This film incorporates a scene where, when Eddie is killed by Pennywise, Richie is visibly more upset than the rest of the Losers' Club. It is revealed in one of the final scenes of the film that Richie recarves his and Eddie's initials into a bridge.

Director Andy Muschietti has stated that the decision to depict Richie as gay in It Chapter Two was based on this interpretation of the book. Stephen King said that while he didn't intend for there to be an unrequited romance between the two characters, he approved of the storyline, saying "it’s one of those things that’s kind of genius, because it echoes the beginning [with Adrian Mellon's gay bashing]. It comes full circle. At least there’s love involved. Somebody cares for [Eddie,] and that echoes the love that Adrian’s partner has for him. So that was cool.”

Comedy

Richie is known as being the comedian of The Losers Club, often telling jokes at inappropriate times, which leads to his friends often saying "Beep Beep, Richie" when they want him to stop talking. Richie's humor has been viewed as being either a defense mechanism, or a call for attention. It has been speculated that Richie uses his comedy as a defense mechanism, to hide his fear of not only Pennywise, but his fear of not being accepted by The Losers Club. Once Richie has his first encounter with Pennywise, his comedy turns into a coping mechanism as well, hiding his fears of the supernatural being and the possibility of his death at the hands of the creature. Strictly in It Chapter Two, it has been interpreted by some fans that Richie's comedic defense mechanism also doubles as him hiding his romantic feelings for Eddie Kaspbrak. It has also been speculated that Richie's comedy derives from a feeling of neglect by his parents, and as a cry for attention from his friends. He wants to have the attention and love from his friends that he doesn't receive at home from his parents.

Appearances in other King stories

Richie briefly appears in a cameo appearance in King's novel 11/22/63. In the novel, after the events of Pennywise, Richie is seen dancing with Beverly preparing for a talent show. The two are approached by time traveler Jake Epping, who enquires about the Dunning family. Afterwards, Epping teaches the two how to dance properly. However, this meeting is erased by the end of the novel as Epping removes his mark on history.

In King's novel Duma Key, the song excerpt in the beginning is by a band called Shark Puppy. In the credits page of the book, the song is written by R. Tozier and W. Denbrough.

Reception

The portrayals of Richie in the 2017 remake by Wolfhard and the 2019 sequel by Hader were both highly praised and considered to be "show-stealers". Both portrayals were noted for their comedic relief and chemistry with their fellow cast members, in particular between Wolfhard and Jack Dylan Grazer for the first film and Hader and James Ransone in the second. Hader's portrayal was noted for its blend of comedy and drama when required, as well as the subtle references to Richie's sexuality and his implicated love for Eddie, referred to by Pennywise as his "dirty little secret."

References

Characters in American novels of the 20th century
Drama television characters
Literary characters introduced in 1986
Fictional characters from Maine
Fictional comedians
Fictional LGBT characters in film
Fictional LGBT characters in literature
Fictional gay males
Horror television characters
Stephen King characters
It (novel)
Fictional DJs
Male characters in literature
Male characters in film
Male characters in television